Lý Hùng is a Vietnamese former vovinam artist, actor, film director, producer, entrepreneur, philanthropist, activist and sometimes singer.

Biography

Personal life
 Parents: Lý Huỳnh (father), Đoàn Thị Nguyên (mother)
 Brother: Lý Điền Sơn (film director and entrepreneur)
 Sisters: Lý Nga (entrepreneur), Lý Thanh (entrepreneur), Lý Hương (actress), Lý Hồng (vocalist)

Filmography

 Phượng (1982)
 Nơi bình yên chim hót (1986)
 Phạm Công - Cúc Hoa (1989)
 Người không mang họ (1990)
 The Tayson Gallantry (1991)
 Nước mắt học trò (1993)
 Tây Sơn hào kiệt (2010)
 Thiên đường ở bên ta (2010)
 Về đất Thăng Long (2011)
 Nghiệt oan (2011)
 Cù lao lúa (2011)
 Cuộc đối đầu hoàn hảo (2012)
 Cuộc chiến quý ông (2014)
 Lời sám hối (2014)
 Bằng chứng vô hình
 Lớp học một không hai (2014)
 Bình minh trên ngọn lửa (2014)
 Một văn phòng luật sư (2015)
 Dệt nắng cho ngày dài hơn (2015)
 Trại cá sấu (2015)
 Ông trùm (2015)
 Thề không gục ngã (2015)
 Đoạn trường nam ai (2015)
 Đường chân trời (2016)
 Hợp đồng định mệnh (2016)
 Người nhà quê (2017)
 Biển đời giông tố (2017)
 Dollars trắng
 Lá sầu riêng
 Kế hoạch 99
 Phi vụ phượng hoàng
 Sau những giấc mơ hồng
 Đồng tiền nhân nghĩa
 Bên dòng sông Trẹm
 Hồng hải tặc
 Bước qua quá khứ
 Tình ngỡ đã phôi pha
 Đàn chim và cơn bão
 Trong vòng tay chờ đợi
 Bông hồng đẫm lệ
 Cảnh sát đặc khu
 Lệnh truy nã
 Lửa cháy thành Đại La
 Ngọc trong đá
 Ngôi nhà oan khốc
 Nước mắt buồn vui
 Sơn thần - thủy quái
 Thăng Long đệ nhất kiếm
 Võ sĩ bất đắc dĩ

Honors

References

 
 Liên hoan phim Việt Nam tôn vinh dòng phim mì ăn liền - VietNamNet // Thứ Năm, 15.12.2011, 15:32:36 (GMT+7)
 Bốn lãng tử làm "điên đảo" phụ nữ Việt - Báo Yên Bái // Thứ Hai, 14.05.2012, 09:06:39 (GMT+7)
 Ngôi sao còn sót lại của dòng phim thị trường những năm 1990 - Dân Trí // Chủ Nhật, 22.09.2013, 13:40 (GMT+7)
 Những tài tử khuynh đảo trái tim triệu cô gái Việt thập niên 1990 - VietnamNet // 07.10.2013, 14:50 (GMT+7)
 Lý Hùng, Lê Tuấn Anh giờ ra sao ? - VietNamNet // 09.01.2014, 17:52 (GMT+7)
 Chuyện đời nhan sắc Việt bị bắt oan, mất trắng danh tiếng - VietnamNet // 09.08.2015, 03:00 (GMT+7)
 Y Phụng lần đầu lên tiếng về tình yêu với Lý Hùng - VietnamNet // 16.08.2015, 03:00 (GMT+7)
 Những phim cổ trang kinh điển ấn tượng nhất Việt Nam (phần 1) - VietnamNet // 22.08.2015, 05:00 (GMT+7)
 Lý Hùng, Lê Tuấn Anh - hai lãng tử một thời - Ngôi Sao // 30.09.2015, 00:09 (GMT+7)

1969 births
Hoa people
People from Vĩnh Long province
People from Ho Chi Minh City
Vietnamese male film actors
20th-century Vietnamese male singers
Vietnamese businesspeople
Living people